Teignbridge was, from 1983 until 2010, a county constituency represented in the House of Commons of the Parliament of the United Kingdom. It elected one Member of Parliament (MP) by the first past the post system of election.

Boundaries and history
1983–1997: The District of Teignbridge wards of Abbotskerwell, Ambrook, Ashburton, Bishopsteignton, Bradley, Buckfastleigh, Buckland, Bushell, Chudleigh, college, Dawlish Central, Dawlish North East, Dawlish South West, Haldon, Haytor, Ipplepen, Kingskerwell, Kingsteignton East, Kingsteignton West, Milber, Moorland, Moretonhampstead, Shaldon, Teignhydes, Teignmouth Central, Teignmouth East, Teignmouth North, and Teignmouth West, and the District of South Hams ward of Eastmoor.

1997–2010: The District of Teignbridge wards of Abbotskerwell, Bishopsteignton, Bradley, Buckland, Bushell, Chudleigh, college, Dawlish Central, Dawlish North East, Dawlish South West, Haldon, Haytor, Ipplepen, Kingskerwell, Kingsteignton East, Kingsteignton West, Milber, Moorland, Moretonhampstead, Shaldon, Teignhydes, Teignmouth Central, Teignmouth East, Teignmouth North, and Teignmouth West.

The constituency was based on the Teignbridge local government district in Devon.  It was created in 1983 from parts of the seats of Totnes and Tiverton.  Towns in the constituency included Dawlish, Newton Abbot and Teignmouth.

The seat was held by Patrick Nicholls of the Conservative Party from its creation until his defeat by Richard Younger-Ross of the Liberal Democrats at the 2001 general election.  Younger-Ross successfully defended the seat in 2005, with a majority of 6,215 over the Conservatives' Stanley Johnson, the father of Boris Johnson.

Abolition
Following a review of parliamentary representation in Devon by the Boundary Commission for England, which increased the number of seats in the county from 11 to 12, the Teignbridge constituency was abolished.  The southern part, including the main towns of Dawlish, Newton Abbot and Teignmouth, formed the new Newton Abbot seat, while the northern portion formed part of Central Devon.

Members of Parliament

Elections

Elections in the 1980s

Elections in the 1990s

Elections in the 2000s

See also 
 List of parliamentary constituencies in Devon

Notes and references 

Parliamentary constituencies in Devon (historic)
Constituencies of the Parliament of the United Kingdom established in 1983
Constituencies of the Parliament of the United Kingdom disestablished in 2010
Teignbridge